Karina Skibby (born 16 June 1965) is a road cyclist from Denmark. She represented her nation at the 1988 Summer Olympics in the women's road race and at the 1992 Summer Olympics in the women's road race.

Her brother is Olympic cyclist Jesper Skibby and her father is Olympic cyclist Willy Skibby.

References

External links
 profile at sports-reference.com

Danish female cyclists
Cyclists at the 1988 Summer Olympics
Cyclists at the 1992 Summer Olympics
Olympic cyclists of Denmark
Living people
Sportspeople from Frederiksberg
1965 births
20th-century Danish women